Star Fleet Project is a solo project of Brian May, Queen's guitarist, and a mini-album of the same name. Released as the work of Brian May + Friends, the album consisted of May, guitarist Eddie Van Halen, drummer Alan Gratzer (then of REO Speedwagon), Phil Chen (session bassist who played with Jeff Beck and Rod Stewart), and Fred Mandel (keyboard player for Alice Cooper and additional keyboard player on Queen's Hot Space Tour and The Works). "[T]he result is high-octane  instrumentals, instantly Queenish, and not unlike Flash with added fretboard pyrotechnics". The tapes were not intended to be released and received minimal mixing. "Star Fleet Project was called a 'mini-album' by [May] because he thought it...too short to be a proper album, but too long to be even an EP single".

Production 
The idea for the album came from May's son Jimmy, a fan of Star Fleet, the English title of Japanese sci-fi puppet TV show X-Bomber. "[M]y little boy had been watching this science fiction series and I always thought that the theme tune for it would be a great vehicle for all-out guitar playing". "And [Jim] said, 'Daddy, you should play that!', and I thought, 'Actually, that's a rather good piece of music!'" There was a seven-month period between May watching the show with his son and the mini-LP's recording. "We were all in a little bit of downtime in our own projects. Queen was in a bit of a hiatus, and I think Van Halen weren't doing too much and my neighbour [in Los Angeles] Alan Gratzer from R.E.O. [Speedwagon] wasn't doing much and we got together". Recorded on 21 and 22 April 1983 at the Record Plant Studios, Los Angeles, California, the mini-album was released in October that same year. The record consists of three songs: "Star Fleet", "Let Me Out", and "Blues Breaker". The album name apparently comes from the title track: "Because one song was called 'Star Fleet', [May] dubbed the jam session...Star Fleet Project".

"Star Fleet", May's hard-rock arrangement of the Star Fleet theme tune, "soars on more sheer guitar power as the piece is translated into interstellar heavy metal", with heavy emphasis on May's and Van Halen's guitar work, as May "intended to provide a platform for Van Halen's soloing skills with...Star Fleet". The "strongest" track, the song "[carries] both the energy and full flavor of an early Queen work". "Van Halen's and May's guitar solos bounce off one another like playful lions". This "[bouncing] off one another" is intended, as May explained: "I wanted to play in a sympathetic way to him, to supply the great rhythms that he could play to. I wanted to be the perfect rhythm guitarist, and I grew up as a rhythm guitarist, so that's natural to me. But when we were trading solos... we were feeding off each other.... We'd never played together before, and yet the chemistry is there. It was as spontaneous as anything could be". "Edward played the solo on 'Star Fleet' three times. Each time it was incredible. Each time it was different". Prior to beginning work on the project, May "attempted to get in touch with the song's writer, British keyboardist Phil Bliss, but was unsuccessful until after the Star Fleet Project was completed". Of this attempted contact, May said, "I tried to get in touch with the guy who had written the song, Paul Bliss, and couldn't at the time. So I pressed on and did some arrangement around a couple of verses and wrote extra middle bit for it. Later I got in touch with him, and he said it was a pity that I couldn't find him in the early days because he's got some more verse in the middle – which I'm dying to hear – but it was too late for the project. My song does follow his musical theme, and I used the verse he wrote". Apparently "Brian sent a signed copy of the finished [mini-album] to... Bliss, with a message thanking him for his composition".

"Let Me Out", "an old song of [May's] which found new life", "turns into a blues jam, with Brian and Van Halen trading licks". "[Not as] structured", the song "does carry a nice, bluesy swagger". During this song, "Edward tortures his top string to its audible death and winds up quite naturally on the remaining five". The song "received its first live performance on 7 December 1990 at the Astoria Theatre, when Brian guest-starred on guitar for the last four minutes of The Cross' Fan Club gig....[and got] one additional airing on 7 July 2001 at [the Auditorium Stravinksi] as part of the Montreux Jazz Festival), with Brian on guitars and vocals, Jon Clearly on piano, Chris Spedding on guitar, John Hatton on bass, Bernie Dresel on drums, and Emily [May], [Jim May], and Anita [Dobson] providing backing vocals". "Queen fans may enjoy the piano blues "Let Me Out" best, as it sounds like it would have fit right in on News of the World. I can imagine Freddie putting his spin on it quite easily. Brian takes the first solo, but next time he says "Help me, Edward!" and it's Van Halen playing the blues....Brian and [Edward] alternate, and then [Edward] blazes the fretboard shredder style".

"Blues Breaker", "a 13-minute piece of improvisation highlighted by the attacks and counter-attacks of May and Van Halen", "a masterpiece...for its pure spontaneity", is a "long blues jam (edited together from several recorded that day), with no lyrics or vocals.... The liner notes dedicate this piece to E. C. (Eric Clapton), and that's where the name comes from". "[W]hen we started... the Blues Breaker track, I think we kind of had Eric Clapton in our minds and the people that Clapton would revere like [B.B.] King, Muddy Waters; it was the power of the blues which made us gel. I remember [Edward] saying, 'You know, you got me to play today in a way that I haven't played for years.' Just simple and from the heart and with that kind of feeling". Heavy metal magazine Kerrang! said of the song, "It has something epic, as if every one of the players touched deep into [the] collective music lexicon, and promptly replied to his previous speaker". This song and "Let Me Out" were more spontaneous than "Star Fleet", with May showing off his signature sound and Van Halen using his uniqe tapping technique to great effect. "May sent... 'Blues Breaker' to Eric Clapton, who reportedly found the song to not be terribly bluesy. [Edward Van Halen] was greatly disappointed". More than finding the song "not...terribly bluesy", Clapton took insult from the song, finding it horrible. "May was on the defensive when he talked about "Bluesbreaker" [sic], a lengthy jam dedicated to Eric Clapton, which took up all of side two: 'It seemed very indulgent putting out a long jam, but having listened to it, I think it's worthwhile...it's rock blues with all the mistakes left in'".

On the mini-album as a whole, Van Halen said:

That was just a get-together jam. [May] invited me down to... Record Plant and we played.... After we played, he called me up about four months later and asked what I thought about putting the stuff out. And I said, "Send me the tape, let me hear it first," because I didn't remember how it went. He did and said, "Sure, what the hell." It reeks of fun.

Releases 
The project was originally released on 31 October 1983, and was later re-released in November of that year.

Capitol released "[a] shorter edit of 'Starfleet'....[a] move [which] proved to be a disaster...".

"Star Fleet Project" was released on two CD formats. It was first re-issued as part of May's "Back to the Light" single, in two CDs: the first featured "Star Fleet" and "Let Me Out", the second "Blues Breaker".

In 1993, the songs were re-issued as tracks 6–8 of the Japanese mini-album Resurrection.

Reception 
Although the album did not do well initially—by the end of the year it reached No. 35 in the UK and No. 125 in the US, with the "Star Fleet" single being counted as "a non-starter at 65" that "received no daytime radio airplay", individuals took a liking to the mini-LP—so much so that by 1984, it was reported that the album was "already a cult guitar favorite. Where solo efforts often tend to be politely applauded and then forgotten as an artist's 'indulgence', the raw power of this album has given it instant, unanticipated acceptance.... [May admitted:] 'I must contest I still enjoy it—I still put it on the record player and like what I hear'". "[O]n this album May is able to let loose and allow his blues influences to show through....[T]he expert musicianship shows through in such a way that makes [the album] worth purchasing". "[T]here is so much spirited byplay among...May and...Van Halen...Alan Gratzer...Phil Chen and...Fred Mandel that [the mini-album] was just too good to be left sitting in the can". Star Fleet Project was voted Best Spontaneous Recording by Hope College in 1984. "[I]t lived on – at the conclusion of 'One Vision' on the 1986 Magic tour, [Queen] launched into the ascending false conclusion [of 'Star Fleet'] before [going] into 'Tie Your Mother Down'". This occurred at Råsundastadion and Wembley. By 1993, general perception of the mini-album was favorable, as Joe Kleon wrote in Scene magazine: "[May] has appeared in many projects, including the highly-acclaimed "Star Fleet Project" released in 1983 with [Edward] Van Halen". In comparing Star Fleet Project to the Ultima Thule Mix of May's song New Horizons, Rolling Stone journalist Kory Grow wrote that "May's first-ever solo recording was also a tribute to space travel".

Re-release 
In late 2021, May stated that Star Fleet Project would be re-released following the re-releases of Back to the Light and Another World, "I'm going to do Star Fleet, which is the one with Eddie Van Halen, after that". Following Van Halen's death on 6 October 2020, May stated that "[a]t some point it would be lovely to revisit [Star Fleet Project] in depth, but at the moment I'm not. It doesn't feel right now". 

May explained "I didn't want to do [Star Fleet] first, because I wanted to put my proper solo album out first... I'll do [Back to the Light] first, Another World and then the third one will be Star Fleet". Another World was re-released on 22 April 2022, As of late 2022, the remastering process for Star Fleet was in progress.

Track listing

Personnel
 Brian May – guitar, vocals, production, keyboards
 Edward Van Halen – guitar
 Alan Gratzer – drums
 Phil Chen – bass guitar
 Fred Mandel – keyboards
 Roger Taylor – backing vocals on "Star Fleet", added and mixed at SARM Studios
 Mack – mixing
 Mike Beiriger – engineering
 Nicholas Froome – additional engineering

References

External links
 Star Fleet Project music video

1983 debut EPs
Brian May albums